The Art Collection of Marshall Owen Roberts was a collection of sculpture, antiques and paintings owned by New York industrialist Marshall Owen Roberts. The collection, which featured many prominent American artists and works, including Emanuel Leutze's Washington Crossing the Delaware, remained intact following his 1880 death until it was auctioned off in 1897.

History
Roberts was a noted art collector and staunch supporter of American artists who never sold or exchanged a painting after he bought it. He was considered the prototypical New York patron, like Gilpin in Philadelphia and Harrison Gray Otis in Boston. He "made no pretensions to connoisseurship, but was guided in his purchases simply by fancy, or with a view to assisting some needy artist." Roberts served on the Metropolitan Museum of Art's Board of Trustees in 1870 and 1871, and lent some of his paintings to the Metropolitan Fair Picture Gallery in 1864 held at the Fourteenth Street Armory.

Roberts formed his collection of 335 paintings at a time when the Düsseldorf School of German genre paintings were the fashion and the canvases which told human stories were most worthy of attention.

His best-known acquisition is Emanuel Leutze's 1851 painting Washington Crossing the Delaware, which he bought for $10,000 (at the time, an enormous sum). Roberts built an art gallery, attached to his home, 107 Fifth Avenue (at the southeast corner of 18th Street), where he displayed his collection, which included Rembrandt Peale's Babes in the Wood, Daniel Huntington's Venice, Good Samaritan and Old Lawyer, Frederick Stuart Church's Rainy Season in the Tropics and Coast of Maine, Régis François Gignoux's Hawk's Nest, West Virginia, Richard Caton Woodville's War News from Mexico, Asher Brown Durand's Indian Rescue, Schaeffele's Marie de Medici's Visit to Ruben's Studio, Johann Georg Meyer's First Lesson, Constant Troyon's After the Hunt, Paul Falconer Poole's Pension Agent, Charles Verlat's Sheep in Pasture, Paul Delaroche's Napoleon at Fontainbleau, Ernest Meissonier's The Smoker (1849) Thomas Sidney Cooper's Monarch of the Plain, Édouard Frère's Mother and Infant and The Industrious Mother, John Frederick Kensett's Noon by the Sea Shore and Franconia Notch, Henry Peters Gray's Rose of Fiesole and Just Fifteen, George A. Baker's Love at First Sight, Wild Flowers and Children of the Wood, John George Brown's His First Cigar, Thomas Cole's Old Mill, James McDougal Hart's Old Homestead and Morning in the Adirondacks, William Henry Powell's Landing of the Pilgrims, William Sidney Mount's Raffling for a Goose, Robert Swain Gifford's On The St. Lawrence and View of Quebec, Eugene Benson's Thoughts in Exile, Thomas Sully's Woman at the Well and A Girl Offering Flowers at a Shrine, Seymour Joseph Guy's A Field Daisy and Good Sister, Charles Loring Elliott's Portrait of Himself, and George Henry Boughton's Gypsy Women, Jean-Léon Gérôme's The Egyptian Conscript, James Augustus Suydam's On the Beach, Charles Baugniet's Dressing for the Ball, Benjamin Vautier's The Letter, as well as works by M. H. Koekkoek Édouard Detaille.

In addition to the 1876 Indian Vase by his son-in-law Ames Van Wart, Roberts collection included a 1,000 different numbers in bronze, art objects and furnishings. His sculptures included Erastus Dow Palmer's medallion base-reliefs Night and Morning, Franklin Simmons's The Promised Land, and Voso's Cupid and Psyche.

Auction of collection
Roberts died on September 11, 1880 while in Saratoga Springs, New York. The entire collection was left to his widow, the former Sarah Lawrence "Susan" Endicott. At the time of his death, it was reported that he had spent $600,000 on the collection which was then worth over $750,000. In 1892, Susan remarried to Ralph Vivian of Claverton Manor They moved to London and the collection remained in the Fifth Avenue home, which remained unoccupied other than during the winter of 1893 to 1894 when Cornelius and Alice Gwynne Vanderbilt leased the mansion while they were expanded their chateau at Fifth Avenue and 57th Street.

In 1897, Susan hired Messrs. Ortgies & Co. of the Fifth Avenue Art Galleries, under the management of Samuel P. Avery, Jr., to auction off the entire collection. The auction of the paintings took place at Chickering Hall on the evenings of January 19, 20, and 21, 1897.  The statuary, art objects, and other furnishings were auctioned off from the Fifth Avenue home on January 18 and 22.

In total, $41,754 was received for the sale of 172 pictures, $8,764 during the first night's sale and $32,990 the following night at Chickering Hall. The Roberts home on Fifth Avenue was sold and in July 1901, architect Robert Maynicke filed plans for a new eleven-story building to be erected by Henry Corn on the site of home. The new building, extant today at 105 Fifth Avenue, was original location of the Barnes & Noble chain of bookstores from 1932 to 2014.

Collection
Paintings

Sculpture and pottery

References
Notes

Sources

External links

Marshall O. Roberts at the Library of Congress

 
Private art collections